Chirostylus is a genus of squat lobsters in the family Chirostylidae, containing the following species:
 Chirostylus dolichopus Ortmann, 1892
 Chirostylus micheleae Tirmizi & Khan, 1979
 Chirostylus novaecaledoniae Baba, 1991
 Chirostylus ortmanni Miyake & Baba, 1968
 Chirostylus rostratus Osawa & Nishikiori, 1998
 Chirostylus stellaris Osawa, 2007

References

Squat lobsters